The 2015 European Mixed Team Badminton Championships were held at the Sportoase in Leuven, Belgium, between 11 and 15 February and were organised by Badminton Europe and Badminton Vlaanderen. It was the 23rd edition of the tournament. Germany was the defending champion. The draw was made on 18 December 2014.

Participating Countries
33 national teams entered the competition of which 12 are participating in the final event. Five countries qualified for the final directly, the remaining nations qualified by winning their qualification group.

* — at the time of the entry deadline, not taken into consideration ranking of Belgium and Germany.

One day before the start of the event, Spain withdrew their team from the competition.

Group stage

Group 1

Group 2

Group 3

Group 4

Knockout stage

Quarterfinals

Semifinals

Final

References

External links
Official website
tournamentsoftware.com

2015
European Mixed Team Badminton Championships
2015 European Mixed Team Badminton Championships
European Mixed Team Badminton Championships
Sport in Leuven
International sports competitions hosted by Belgium